Samuel Benjamin Hayley (July 31, 1890 – November 1, 1970) was an American college football player. His registration for the First World War says he was a chemist. Hayley was from Jackson, Tennessee.

University of Tennessee
Hayley was a prominent tackle for the Tennessee Volunteers football teams of the University of Tennessee, captain of the 1913 team.  He was selected All-Southern the same year. At Tennessee, he was a member of Sigma Alpha Epsilon.

References

1890 births
1970 deaths
20th-century American chemists
20th-century chemists
American football tackles
Tennessee Volunteers football players
All-Southern college football players
People from Jackson, Tennessee
Players of American football from Tennessee